Shiroky may refer to:
Shiroky, Amur Oblast, an urban-type settlement in Amur Oblast, Russia
Shiroky, Magadan Oblast, an urban-type settlement in Magadan Oblast, Russia